The 2019–20 season is New Basket Brindisi's 28th in existence and the club's 9th consecutive season in the top flight of Italian basketball.

Brindisi 
The 2019-20 season was hit by the coronavirus pandemic that compelled the federation to suspend and later cancel the competition without assigning the title to anyone. Brindisi ended the championship in 5th position.

Kit 
Supplier: Adidas / Sponsor: Happy Casa

Players

Current roster

Depth chart
Brindisi starts the season with the 5+5 format, but in January they pay the so called "luxury tax" of 40 thousand euros, that moves the team to the 6+6 format. In this new format the team can play with one foreign player more, a total of six, in the Italian championship.

Squad changes

In

|}

Out

|}

Confirmed 

|}

Coach

Competitions

SuperCup 

Brindisi took part in the 25th edition of the Italian Basketball Supercup as the 2019 Italian Basketball Cup runner-up. They lost the competition at the semifinal against Reyer Venezia.

Serie A

Basketball Champions League

Italian Cup 
Brindisi qualified to the 2020 Italian Basketball Cup having ended the first half of the season in 7th place. They lost in the finals against Umana Reyer Venezia.

References 

2019–20 in Italian basketball by club
2019–20 Basketball Champions League
New Basket Brindisi